The Big Eight Conference was an NCAA Division I-A athletic conference 1907–1996.

Big Eight Conference may also refer to:

Big 8 Conference (California), a community-college athletic conference
Big Eight Conference (IHSAA), Indiana and Illinois, a high-school athletic conference
Big Eight Conference (Iowa), a defunct high-school athletic conference
Big 8 Conference (Missouri), a high-school athletic conference
WIAA Big Eight Conference, Wisconsin, a high-school athletic conference